Bembidion dentellum is a species of ground beetle native to Europe.

References

dentellum
Beetles described in 1787
Beetles of Europe